Svitoch is a Lviv-based Ukrainian confectionery manufacturer. It is owned by Nestlé since 1998. The company produces chocolate, chocolate candy, lollipops and many other types of candy.

Overview 
The confectionery was established as Svitoch in 1962 through the merging of various confectionaries, although it traces its history under other names to 1882. In the Soviet era, Svitoch was considered one of the best manufacturers, along with the Rot Front and Babaevsky chocolate factories. After its acquisition by Nestlé in mid-1990s, the company opted to produce more Western-style chocolate with lower cocoa content and was forced to move into middle segment of the market, losing some of its appeal, but gaining greater turnovers. It is unclear how this will affect its future development, though, as dark, highly sophisticated chocolate is becoming increasingly more popular with Ukrainians. This change in strategy provoked a labour dispute in late 1990s.

In 2013, Nestlé invested $4.4 million in modernising the Svitoch factory.

Svitoch rebranded Strela candy ( - Arrow) as Stozhary ( - Pleiades) but had little success.

At the beginning of 2015, it was a modern, high-tech, scientifically intensive and developing enterprise. There are lines for the production of waffles, chocolate bars and candies, a fundamentally new automated production for the preparation of chocolate masses.

See also
 Roshen
 Konti Group

References

External links 
 Svitoch on Nestle Ukraine website

Ukrainian chocolate companies
Confectionery companies of Ukraine
Nestlé brands
Food and drink companies of the Soviet Union
Ukrainian brands
Companies based in Lviv
Food and drink companies established in 1962
1962 establishments in Ukraine
1998 mergers and acquisitions